John Murray "Moe" Henderson (September 5, 1921 — January 4, 2013) was a Canadian professional ice hockey defenceman who played 405 games in the National Hockey League with the Boston Bruins between 1945 and 1952.

Playing career
Born in Toronto, Ontario in 1921, Henderson played junior hockey with the Toronto Young Rangers. In 1942 he joined the Royal Canadian Air Force and was stationed on the Pacific coast where he flew patrol missions. He was discharged two years later following the death of his father. Henderson played briefly for the Boston Olympics, a farm team of the Boston Bruins, before joining the big club for five games at the end of the 1944-1945 season. In total Henderson played eight seasons with the Bruins and registered 24 goals and 62 assists. Following his NHL career, he spent four seasons as the player-coach of the Hershey Bears.

Henderson is the nephew of the Conacher brothers Roy, Lionel and Charlie who were all inducted into the Hockey Hall of Fame. He is also the cousin of Brian, Pete and Lionel Conacher, Jr.

Career statistics

Regular season and playoffs

References

External links 
 

1921 births
2013 deaths
Boston Bruins players
Boston Olympics players
Burials at York Cemetery, Toronto
Canadian expatriate ice hockey players in the United States
Canadian ice hockey coaches
Canadian ice hockey defencemen
Hershey Bears coaches
Hershey Bears players
Ontario Hockey Association Senior A League (1890–1979) players
Royal Canadian Air Force personnel of World War II
Ice hockey people from Toronto
Toronto Marlboros players
Toronto Young Rangers players